The Greeks in Poland form one of the country's smaller minority groups, numbering approximately 3,600.

History

Greeks, particularly merchants and traders, have been present in the Polish lands since the Bolesław I the Brave, funding a number of Orthodox churches and cemeteries throughout the Polish–Lithuanian Commonwealth. However most of these immigrants eventually assimilated into the diverse groups that trace their heritage from this polity such as Poles, Lithuanians, Belarusians, and Ukrainians.

Most self-identified Greeks in Poland today trace their heritage to the large number of Greek citizens who fled as refugees from the Greek Civil War and were admitted into Poland. They consisted largely of members of former communist partisan units from the Greek region of Macedonia. Most had been farmers before their flight from Greece. In total, from 1949 to 1951, 12,300 people from Greece came to Poland, of whom roughly one-quarter were children.

Most refugees arrived by sea through the port at Gdynia. The Polish government chose to settle them in the territories west of the Oder River near the border with East Germany, especially near Zgorzelec. About 200 were also sent to Krościenko in the southeast, near the Bieszczady Mountains in a formerly ethnic Ukrainian area. Initially, the refugees were celebrated as anti-capitalist heroes and given significant government assistance in building new lives and integrating in Poland. Initially, they found employment on farms, for which they were well suited because of their rural background; however, they later gravitated towards urban areas.

Some refugees chose to return to Greece early on. By 1957, still roughly 10,000 remained in Poland. However, suspicions later fell on them of being Titoist agents. A large number were deported to Bulgaria in 1961. A 1985 agreement between the governments of Poland and Greece that enabled Greek refugees to receive retirement pensions at home, led to emigration back to Greece.

In 1950 the refugees from Greece were organized in the Community of Political Refugees from Greece, based in Zgorzelec. Two years later it moved to Wroclaw and was renamed in 1953 Nikos Beloyannis Union of Political Refugees from Greece. After the fall of the dictatorship in Greece it changed its name into Association of Greeks in Poland, but in 1989, an internal schism led to the creation of the Association of Macedonians in Poland.

Minority status
In his essay, published by the Helsinki Foundation for Human Rights, professor Slawomir Lodzinski states:
At present, the full legal protection is limited to this national minorities which are groups of Polish citizens, are “old”, “native” and on non-immigrant origin. This perspective has caused that the groups of Greeks [...] who have been recognized as national minorities from the 1950s, from the beginning of the 1990s are not treated as national minorities by the state.

Answering a question by Brunon Synak, President of the Kashubian-Pomeranian Association, at a meeting organized by the Council of Europe in 2002, Mr. Dobiesław Rzemieniewski, Head of the National Minorities Division in the Ministry of Internal Affairs and Administration, explained that Greeks are "not classified as national minorities since they do not meet the requirement of being traditionally domiciled on the territory of the Republic of Poland". 

In 2021, political scientist and historian  wrote an article "On the need to recognize the Greeks in Poland as a national minority", in the Polish journal Review of Nationalities, advocating for the government of Poland to recognize the Greeks as a national minority. Dudra concluded that:

Notable people
 Apostolis Anthimos
 Eleni Tzoka

See also
Greece–Poland relations
Refugees of the Greek Civil War in Poland
Macedonians in Poland

References

Further reading

External links 
  Bilateral relations between Greece and Poland 
  Greek embassy in Warsaw
  (Association of Greeks in Poland)

 
 
Poland
Ethnic groups in Poland